Adelaide was a wooden cutter that was wrecked near Bird Island, Norah Head, New South Wales, in May 1834. She was carrying a load of timber.

Shipwrecks of the Central Coast Region
Ships built in New South Wales
1832 ships
Maritime incidents in May 1834
1788–1850 ships of Australia
Merchant ships of Australia
Cutters of Australia